Aspasmogaster costata, the eastern clingfish or pink clingfish is a species of clingfish from the family Gobiesocidae. It is endemic to eastern Australia where it occurs from Byron Bay to the Nadgee Nature Reserve in southern New South Wales and also on Lord Howe Island in the Tasman Sea. The species was described in 1885 by James Douglas Ogilby with a type locality of Shark Reef near Port Jackson in New South Wales.

References

Fish described in 1885
costata